Holgate School was a state school in Barnsley, South Yorkshire, England. It was closed in 2012, when it was merged with The Kingstone School to form Horizon Community College. After Holgate closed, it was demolished and the site was turned into a car park for Horizon Community College.

Admissions
The school was awarded the status of Sports College in 2005 for its attention to sporting achievements.

History

Holgate School was founded in 1546 in Hemsworth by Robert Holgate, the Archbishop of York. In 1888 it was re-organised and moved to Barnsley, South Yorkshire. The grammar school had around 850 boys and moved to its present site in 1912. The school has now closed due to the conjoining of the two Barnsley schools Holgate and Kingstone, coming together to form Horizon Community College.

In January 1981, Michael Parkinson said that Barnsley Grammar School was to his education what myxomatosis was to rabbits.

Comprehensive
In 1978 it became a fully co-educational comprehensive school, having first admitted its first comprehensive first year intake in 1973. The sixth form went soon after, in 1980.

Academic performance
It got GCSE results under the England average but about average for Barnsley. Like all schools in Barnsley, except the Barnsley Academy, it had no sixth form, with A levels taken at Barnsley College.

Notable alumni

 Sam Nixon - a UK pop singer and television presenter
 Azeem Rafiq, cricketer

Barnsley and District Holgate Grammar School
 Frank Atkinson CBE, Director from 1970 to 1987 of Beamish Museum, President from 1974 to 1975 of the Museums Association
 Denis Barker, former BP executive
 Frederick Woodward Branson, X-ray pioneer
 Sir Stuart Burgess CBE, Chairman from 1995 to 2004 of Finsbury Worldwide Pharmaceutical
 Dave Burland, folk singer
 Donald Chapman, Baron Northfield, Labour MP from 1951 to 1970 for Birmingham Northfield
 Prof Norman Chapman, G. F. Grant Professor of Chemistry from 1956 to 1992 at the University of Hull
 Prof Gordon Cherry, Professor of Urban and Regional Planning from 1976 to 1991 at the University of Birmingham
 Prof John Coyne CBE, Vice Chancellor from 2004 to 2015 of the University of Derby, Chairman since 2017 of British Canoeing
 Prof Donald Davie, poet
 Brian Fieldhouse, Chief Executive from 1990 to 1995 of West Sussex County Council
 Brian Glover, actor
 Michael Green, Controller from 1986 to 1996 of BBC Radio 4, and Chairman from 1990 to 1995 of the Radio Academy
 Jimmy Greenhoff, and his brother Brian, footballers
 Prof Alan Hall FRS, Director of Cell Biology from 2006 to 2015 at the Memorial Sloan Kettering Cancer Center
 Harry Hill, Chief Executive from 1998 to 2007 of Countrywide plc, and founded Rightmove in 2000
 Sir Ronald Holroyd FRS, former ICI executive, President in 1965 of the Society of Chemical Industry
 Flight Sergeant David Horsfall (16 April 1920 - 17 May 1943), who flew on the Dambusters Raid as a Flight Engineer in Lancaster AJ-A with pilot Squadron Leader Dinghy Young DFC; the aircraft was the fourth to bomb the Möhne Dam, but was hit by flak when returning near the Dutch coast at Castricum aan Zee; he is buried at Bergen General Cemetery
 Eric Illsley, Labour MP from 1987 to 2011 for Barnsley Central, convicted of fraud in the United Kingdom Parliamentary expenses scandal
 Tom Johnson, footballer
 John Malcolm, actor
 Martyn Moxon, Director of Pro Cricket at Yorkshire CCC, Yorkshire and England cricketer
 Sir Michael Parkinson, broadcaster and journalist
 Jack Pickering, footballer
 William Prior CBE, Chairman from 1979 to 1984 of the Yorkshire Electricity Board
 Paul Quinn, lead guitarist of Saxon 
 William Rayner, novelist
 Neil Rhodes, Chief Constable from 2012 to 2017 of Lincolnshire Police
 Stan Richards, actor best known for playing the role of Seth Armstrong in the soap opera Emmerdale from 1978 to 2004
 Denis Roberts, former Managing Director at the GPO, and Chairman from 1981 to 1985 of the British Philatelic Trust
 Dave Rollitt, rugby union player
 Prof Harry Rothwell, Professor of History from 1945 to 1968 at the University of Southampton
 Rev Canon Geoffrey Shaw, Principal from 1979 to 1989 at Wycliffe Hall, Oxford
 William Taylor CBE, Conservative MP from 1950 to 1964 for Bradford North
 Howard Thackstone, Chief General Manager from 1962 to 1966 of Midland Bank
 Norman West, Labour MEP from 1984 to 1998 for Yorkshire South
 David Woodhall CBE, Chief Executive from 1982 to 1992 of the Commission for New Towns (became English Partnerships)
 George Wright (bishop), Anglican Bishop of Sierra Leone

Former teachers
 Peter Dews (director), theatre director (taught 1952-3)
 Joseph Soar MBE, Organist and Master of the Choristers from 1952 to 1954 at St David's Cathedral (taught Music from 1904 to 1915)

See also
 Archbishop Holgate's School, York

References
Notes

Footnotes

External links
 EduBase

Defunct schools in Barnsley
1546 establishments in England
Educational institutions established in the 16th century
2012 disestablishments in England
Educational institutions disestablished in 2012